Peer Åström (born 1972 in Ljusdal, Sweden) is a Swedish composer, lyricist, musician and record producer and partner with Anders Bagge. The two songwriters / producers are known as Bagge & Peer. They have together written and produced songs for Lara Fabian, Celine Dion, Madonna, Ace of Base, Ashley Tisdale, Enrique Iglesias, Jennifer Lopez and several others. Åström is an accomplished musician playing bass guitar, keyboards and drums.

He was interested in music at a very young age. After high school, he studied music studies and moved to Stockholm and became a session musician for several artists. After Anders Bagge, already a renowned producer and songwriter heard a couple of Peer's songs he invited Peer to collaborate with him on some writing/recording projects. Later in 2001, Bagge & Peer began to write and produce on a regular basis as a partnering couple. Åström eventually signed to Bagge's record company Murlyn Music Group (Murlyn Songs).

Peer alongside Anders Bagge, and others co-wrote Celine Dion's "Have You Ever Been in Love" and "Sorry for Love". As a result, he was invited to Miami, Florida  by Celine Dion and her producer Vito Luprano to work on the rest of the album A New Day Has Come. The album went on to sell over 12 million copies worldwide. Celine Dion's cover hit single "I Drove All Night" was co-produced by Peer Åström. In 2007 Åstrom also wrote the song "Fade away" for Dion's Album "Taking Chances", which sold over 3.1 million copies in 2007 alone.

Peer Åström co-wrote and co-produced two songs with Cyndi Lauper and Johan Bobäck for Lauper's 2008 album Bring Ya to the Brink.

In 2008, he mixed the song "Un Garcon" for the French singer Lorie. He is the co-producer of many featured songs in the TV series Glee.

References

External links
Universal Music Publishing Group: Spotlight on Peer Åström

Swedish record producers
Swedish songwriters
Living people
1972 births